Oberleutnant Kurt Robert Wilhelm Wolff PlM (6 February 1895 – 15 September 1917) was one of Imperial Germany's highest-scoring fighter aces during World War I. The frail youthful orphan originally piloted bombers before being picked by Manfred von Richthofen to join Jagdstaffel 11 (Fighter Squadron 11) in the burgeoning Imperial German Air Service. Under the tutelage of Richthofen, Wolff would shoot down 33 enemy aircraft in four months, including 22 victims during the Royal Flying Corps' disastrous Bloody April, 1917. Wolff scored victories so rapidly he outran the Prussian awards system; although the Pour le Merite was customarily awarded after a fighter ace's 20th victory, Wolff's was not received until after his 29th.

On 6 May 1917, after this 29th victory, Wolff was transferred to command Jagdstaffel 29 and score two victories. When Richthofen moved up from Jagdstaffel 11 to become the wing commander of the Flying Circus, his replacement as Jagdstaffel 11 commander was killed. Wolff was transferred to command his old squadron; he scored his 32nd and 33rd victories with them. On 11 July, he was wounded and grounded after a crash landing. On 12 September 1917, the day after he returned to duty, he was promoted to Oberleutnant. Three days later, Wolff made his final patrol, leading a patrol of five in a prototype Fokker Triplane. In a chaotic dogfight with Sopwith Camels from No. 10 Naval Squadron, Wolff nearly collided with his assailant, Norman MacGregor. As Wolff fell out of sight, MacGregor claimed an "out of control" victory. Wolff was probably dead before the triplane's explosive impact.

Early life

Kurt Wolff was born in Greifswald, Pomerania. He was orphaned as a child and was raised by relatives in Memel, East Prussia. Wolff enlisted in the Bavarian Army in 1912 at the age of 17, joining a transport unit, Railway Regiment Nr. 4. He was still with this regiment when World War I began. He received a commission on 17 April 1915, and he transferred to the Fliegertruppen (Flying Troops) in July.

Fighter pilot

Training and first posting

Wolff's first flight was almost his last. The instructor crashed the aircraft, killing himself; Wolff's shoulder was dislocated. Eventually, Wolff received his pilot's badge in late 1915 and was assigned to a series of two-seater bomber units over the next year.

On 12 October 1916 he was posted to La Brayelle Airfield in northern France to join the then victoryless Royal Prussian Jagdstaffel 11 (Hunting Team 11). For months, Wolff and his comrades in the squadron had had no success in aerial combat. That changed when command was given to the Red Baron, Rittmeister (Cavalry Captain) Manfred von Richthofen. Under the Red Baron's leadership, Jagdstaffel 11 began to score victories, and Wolff became an excellent fighter pilot. Like his commanding officer, Wolff soon became an avid collector of souvenirs from the aircraft he shot down. Wolff's room at his airfield soon became decorated with serial numbers, airplane parts and machine guns salvaged from his victims.

Like all the Jagdstaffel 11 aircraft, Wolff's Albatros D.III was painted in the unit's basic red livery. To this, he added individual markings for inflight identification by having his plane's elevators and tailplane painted green. He first claimed an aerial victory on 6 March 1917, a Royal Aircraft Factory B.E.2d of No. 16 Squadron RFC. Four more victories followed during March, making Wolff an ace.

Bloody April

By the end of March 1917, the Royal Flying Corps held a numerical edge over the Luftstreitkräfte of about two to one. The German aircraft numbered about 195; about half these could be used to attack other planes. By contrast, the British were fielding about 365 airplanes; a third were single-seat fighters. However, despite their superior numbers, the British aircraft were technologically inferior to the German fighters. Nevertheless, the British pushed their air offensive over the German lines to maintain their air superiority during April 1917, despite ongoing heavy casualties among their aircrew.

The British lost almost 250 aircraft to German action during Bloody April, 1917; the blood cost came to over 400 British aviators killed or wounded. 
Among Jagdstaffel 11 aces, Sebastian Festner shot down 10 British airplanes; 
Lothar von Richthofen shot down 15; 
Karl Emil Schaefer 16;
Manfred von Richthofen 21; Kurt Wolff shot down 22. Besides the individual victories throughout the month, Wolff would score multiple victories on five April days. Most notable was Friday, 13 April, when Wolff shot down four British airplanes from four different squadrons on four sorties. Also notably, he scored three victories on 29 April 1917, including Major H.D. Harvey-Kelly, commander of No. 19 Squadron RFC. Wolff ended the month with his victims numbering 29. Having previously earned both classes of the Prussian Iron Cross, Wolff was awarded that kingdom's Knight's Cross with Swords of the Royal House Order of Hohenzollern on 26 April. Wolff's rapid victory pace had outrun the awards section; at 20 victories, he became eligible for the Pour le Mérite, but could not receive it before the yet-to-be awarded Hohenzollern.

Wolff in command

Wolff was awarded the German Empire's most prestigious award, the Prussian Pour le Mérite, on 4 May 1917. Two days later, with his victory total at 29, Wolff left his pilot's assignment with Jagdstaffel 11 when he was promoted to command Royal Prussian Jagdstaffel 29. Wolff shot down a French SPAD on 13 May and a No. 60 Squadron Nieuport 17 on 27 June before he returned to Jagdstaffel 11 as its commander in July 1917. Wolff was selected to replace Leutnant (Second lieutenant) Karl Allmenroeder, who had fallen in combat.

Wolff's youthful looks and frail physical stature masked his deadly skills as a combat pilot. As the Adjutant of Jagdstaffel 11, Karl Bodenschatz's estimate of Wolff was:

"...Leutnant Kurt Wolff. At first glance, you could only say 'delicate little flower'. A slender, thin little figure, a very young face, whose entire manner is one of extreme shyness. He looks as if you could tip him backwards with one harsh word. But below this friendly schoolboy's face dangles the order Pour le Mérite. And so far, these modest looking eyes have taken 30 enemy airplanes from the sky over the sights of his machine guns, set them afire, and made them smash to pieces on the ground."

During Wolff's assignment to Jagdstaffel 29 as its commander, Jagdstaffel 11 was one of four squadrons incorporated into the first German fighter wing, Jagdgeschwader I, on 24 June 1917. Manfred von Richthofen was promoted up from squadron command to lead the new wing. Inheriting Richthofen's Jagdstaffel 11 command and leading this squadron as part of the new wing, Wolff downed a RE-8 of No. 4 Squadron RFC and a Sopwith Triplane of No. 1 Naval Squadron in early July for his final victories, the 32nd and 33rd. However, on 11 July Wolff was shot in both his left hand and left shoulder by gunfire from a Sopwith Triplane flown by future ace Flight Sub-Lieutenant Herbert Rowley of No. 1 Naval Squadron. Wolff crash landed his aircraft on the Courtrai railway line. The crash ripped off the undercarriage and flipped the aircraft over. The wreck came to rest with Wolff's head within inches of smashing on a metal fence. His rescuers toted him off to the hospital. Wolff would not return from sick leave until 11 September. The day after his return, he was promoted to oberleutnant (lieutenant).

Final fight
The first two Fokker Triplane prototypes had been allocated to Jagdgeschwader 1. Upon his return on 11 September, Wolff was eager to fly one of the prototypes in Richthofen's absence. Four days later, on 15 September he found his opportunity. Despite heavily overcast skies, he took off in Richthofen's prototype Triplane. He was flying the lone Triplane, leading a patrol of five Albatros fighters.

Meanwhile, three new Sopwith Camels of No. 10 Squadron Royal Naval Air Service, sallied forth from their lines on an offensive patrol. Somewhere in the vicinity of Moorslede, Belgium, at 16.30 hours the trio was the target of a diving attack by Wolff and his patrol. In the confusion of the dogfight, the British pilots mistakenly thought four triplanes were involved. As Wolff singled out a Camel to shoot down, he was suddenly fired on from behind by Flight Sub-Lieutenant Norman MacGregor. MacGregor fired a quick burst from 25 yards range, then had to zoom to avoid colliding with the Fokker. Glancing behind him and downwards, he noted only that Wolff was in a vertical dive. McGregor's combat claim was for an 'out of control' victory.

It seems probable that Wolff was killed by MacGregor's bullets in midair and was already dead when his Triplane crashed and burst into flames north of Wervik near Moorslede at 17.30 hours (German time). Wolff's remains were taken back to Memel for burial. His interment in a military ceremony included display of his native Bavaria's Military Merit Order, 4th Class with Swords, in addition to his Prussian awards.

Awards
Before winning the Pour le Merite on 4 May 1917, Kurt Wolff was awarded both classes of the Iron Cross, the House Order of Hohenzollern, and the Bavarian Military Merit Order, Fourth Class with Swords.

Victory list

Opposing pilots are singly listed as casualties. Double listings are pilot and observer respectively.

Footnote

Endnotes

References

External links

Kurt Wolff's page at theaerodrome.com
Bio and Photos at pourlemerite.org
Photograph of wreckage of Wolff's aircraft

Aerial victories of Wolff, Kurt
Wolff, Kurt
Aviation in World War I

1895 births
1917 deaths
Aviators killed by being shot down
German military personnel killed in World War I
German World War I flying aces
Luftstreitkräfte personnel
People from Greifswald
People from the Province of Pomerania
Prussian Army personnel
Recipients of the Pour le Mérite (military class)